Sopho Khalvashi (born 31 May 1986 in Batumi, Adjara, Georgia), also sometimes known as simply Sopho, is a Georgian musician of Laz heritage.

Biography
She claimed third prize at the commercial song contest "New Wave" 2006 in Jūrmala, Latvia. She then signed a contract with Russian management agency "ARS" led by Russian composer Igor Krutoy. She returned to her homeland, where she received an offer from the Imedi TV channel to host local talent show "On Imedi's waves".

It was announced on 12 December 2006 that she would represent her home nation at the Eurovision Song Contest 2007. The song "Visionary Dream" was Georgia's first entry into the contest. The song was previously called "My Story". In the semi-final on 10 May 2007, she finished eighth; as one of the Top 10 qualifiers she secured a spot for Georgia in the final. In the final on 12 May 2007, she finished 12th, earning maximum points from one country, Lithuania. In November 2018, she was appointed Deputy Mayor of Batumi.

Personal life
Sopho Khalvashi is married to Mikheil Dzodzuashvili, son of Georgian football manager and former player Revaz Dzodzuashvili. Together they have two daughters.

References

External links

SophoKhalvashi.net
Site of Sopho Khalvashi
Sopho's fans site in Israel

1986 births
Living people
21st-century women singers from Georgia (country)
People from Batumi
Laz people
English-language singers from Georgia (country)
Eurovision Song Contest entrants for Georgia (country)
Eurovision Song Contest entrants of 2007
Pop singers from Georgia (country)
Electronic musicians from Georgia (country)
Pop musicians from Georgia (country)